WAPA (1260 AM) is a radio station broadcasting a News Talk Information format as part of the "Borinquen Radio News Network". Licensed to Ponce, Puerto Rico, the station is owned by Grupo AM Puerto Rico, licensed to Wilfredo G. Blanco Pi.

Its programming is also carried by FM translator station W268DJ at 101.5 MHz, also in Ponce.

History
The station was first licensed, as WISO, in 1953 to the South Puerto Rico Broadcasting Company.

On May 23, 2022, after WAPA-TV acquired radio stations WKAQ (AM) and FM in San Juan, and in order to avoid confusion between unrelated broadcasting entities, branding for "WAPA Radio" was changed to "Borinquen Radio". The WBQN call letters that had been assigned to a station on 1160 AM in Barceloneta-Manatí were moved to the former WAPA at 680 AM in San Juan on May 27, and several other call sign changes were made around the network. One resulting change occurred on June 14, 2022, when WISO's call sign was changed to WAPA.

Synchronous relay stations
Until 2017, then-WISO's programming was relayed through two experimental synchronous booster stations that also transmitted on 1260 kHz: WI2XSO, originally licensed June 6, 1999 in Mayaguez, and WI3XSO, originally licensed October 22, 2002 in Aguadilla.

On November 7, 2016, the Federal Communications Commission (FCC) stated that the licenses for WI2XSO and WI3XSO would only be renewed for six months, after which the stations would be deleted. The reason given was that both stations had far exceeded the six-year maximum permitted for experimental authorizations.

Petitions for review of the order to cancel the licenses was submitted on November 23, 2016 and April 24, 2017. However, they were unsuccessful, and the licenses for both WI2XSO and WI3XSO were deleted on May 16, 2017.

In 2018, WVOZ changed its community of license from Morovis to Aguadilla, and began broadcasting on 1580 kHz from the former WI3XSO facility.

Translator stations

References

External links
FCC History Cards for WAPA (covering 1951-1980 as WISO)

FCC Station Search Details: DWI2XSO (Facility ID: 89243)
FCC Station Search Details: DWI3XSO (Facility ID: 130173)

APA
APA
Radio stations established in 1953
1953 establishments in Puerto Rico